Verulam School is a state secondary school for boys with academy status in St Albans, Hertfordshire, England, founded in 1938 as St Albans Boys' Modern School. The name was changed in the 1940s to St Albans Grammar School for Boys and in 1975 to Verulam School, based on the Roman name for St Albans (Verulamium).

The school caters for boys between the ages of 11 and 19. Boys can stay on into the Sixth Form, which also welcomes male and female students from other schools.

The school works in partnership with two neighbouring schools, Sandringham School and Beaumont School, to enhance post-16 educational provision. The partnership, named 'BeauSandVer' enables students to consort between schools for varying A Level subjects.

School performance

A Herts for Learning review in January 2018 rated the school 'Good' and highlighted improvements in the areas criticised by an Ofsted inspection in 2017. A further inspection by Ofsted in July 2018 reached the conclusion that Safeguarding is effective and noted that the school had responded to the October inspection "with great urgency". In September 2018 the school joined the Alban Academy Trust. An Ofsted inspection in October 2018 judged the school to be Good.

In a Kirkland Rowell independent survey of Parents in February 2020, 89% of parents said they would recommend the school.

Houses
Prior to the school's turning comprehensive in 1975, there were four houses, named after the four streets forming a rectangle around the school site. These were Brampton, Hamilton, Jennings and Park. From 1975 onwards, with the increase in the yearly intake, two further houses were added, York and Churchill, also named after nearby roads.

Extra-curricular
The school participates in the Duke of Edinburgh award scheme, taking students through all of the phases from bronze to gold, with expeditions in places such as The Chilterns and The New Forest on Bronze, the South Downs and Dorset Coast on Silver, and Scotland, New Zealand and Morocco on the expeditions for the Gold award.

The school runs a student Jazz–Swing band, the Verulam Big Band. The latter have gone on a European tour.

Alumni 
 Colin Blunstone (b. 1945) pop singer and songwriter, member of The Zombies pop group, together with Chris White, also an alumnus.
 Jeremy Butterworth (b. 1969) playwright, film-script writer and film director.
 Simon Evans (b. 1965) comedian
 Peter Rehberg (1968-2021) electronic musician, founder of the Mego (label).
 John Sessions (1953-2020) British actor and comedian

References

Educational institutions established in 1938
Academies in Hertfordshire
Boys' schools in Hertfordshire
1938 establishments in England
Schools in St Albans